Jayson Donald Edward Wells (born December 22, 1976) is a retired American basketball player.  He won titles in the Finnish, Ukrainian, and Israeli leagues.  He was named to four All-League teams during his professional career. In 2003-04 he was the top rebounder in the Israel Basketball Premier League.

High school career

Born in Cleveland, Ohio, Jayson Wells attended Cleveland Central Catholic High School, graduating in 1994.  He and teammate Earl Boykins led the Ironmen to a 23–2 season in 1994; reaching the Ohio State Quarterfinals; they won consecutive North Coast League titles.  He was selected to the All-North Coast League “First Team” and named to the All-State Team (Honorable Mention).

College career

After high school, Wells attended Indiana State University. He played basketball under head coaches Sherman Dillard & Royce Waltman, leading the team in scoring and rebounding his senior season; he finished his career as the #19 career scorer (1,106 points) and the #13 rebounder (508 total rebounds).   He was named first team All-Missouri Valley following his senior season and third team All-Missouri Valley Conference junior season.

Professional career
Jayson Wells was not selected in the 1998 NBA Draft.  However, he spent 13 seasons playing in 12 countries.  He won titles in Finland, Ukraine, and Israel.  He was selected to All-Pro teams in Sweden, Australia, and Israel. In 2003-04 he was the top rebounder in the Israel Basketball Premier League.

Following his retirement; Wells has built a career in skills development, as well as becoming an author and motivational speaker.

References

External links
 Career stats at Proballers.com
 Jayson Wells International Stats
 Jayson Wells College Stats
 Jayson Wells Player Profile, Indiana State, NCAA Stats, International Stats, Game Logs, Awards - RealGM
 Korean Basketball League stats
 Israeli league stats
 German league stats
 

1976 births
Living people
African-American basketball players
American expatriate basketball people in Argentina
American expatriate basketball people in Finland
American expatriate basketball people in Germany
American expatriate basketball people in Israel
American expatriate basketball people in Italy
American expatriate basketball people in the Netherlands
American expatriate basketball people in South Korea
American expatriate basketball people in Sweden
American expatriate basketball people in the United Arab Emirates
American men's basketball players
08 Stockholm Human Rights players
Atenas basketball players
Basketball players from Cleveland
Cairns Taipans players
Canberra Cannons players
Forwards (basketball)
Hapoel Jerusalem B.C. players
Heroes Den Bosch players
Indiana State Sycamores men's basketball players
Ironi Nahariya players
Maccabi Rishon LeZion basketball players
Namika Lahti players
Orlandina Basket players
Ulsan Hyundai Mobis Phoebus players
21st-century African-American sportspeople
20th-century African-American sportspeople